Gekko hokouensis, also known as the Hokou gecko or Kwangsi gecko, is a species of gecko.

Taxonomy 
The species was first described by the American herpetologist Clifford H. Pope in 1928 as subspecies Gekko japonicus hokouensis. Gekko hokouensis belongs to the subgenus Japonigecko. The species is currently defined morphologically and may include genetically divergent populations. There are no subspecies recognized for Gekko hokouensis.

Geographic range 
It is found in eastern China, the Ryukyu Islands and Kyushu Island of Japan, and Taiwan. Due to its large distribution the IUCN lists the species as least concern. In some areas the invasive Hemidactylus frenatus might pose a threat.

Beavior 
The gecko is nocturnal and preys mostly on insects.

References

Gekko
Reptiles of China
Reptiles of Japan
Reptiles of Taiwan
Reptiles described in 1928
Taxa named by Clifford H. Pope